Empyreuma pugione, the spotted oleander caterpillar moth, is a moth of the subfamily Arctiinae. It is found on the West Indies, but has been introduced to the US state of Florida.

The wingspan is 43–48 mm. The forewings are light chocolate brown with a border fringe of deeper brown. The area between the costal and subcostal veins on the forewing is carmine red. The hindwings are entirely carmine red with a deep brown border fringe. They fly during the day.

The larvae feed on Nerium oleander. They are light orange and hairy.

References

Moths described in 1767
Euchromiina
Taxa named by Carl Linnaeus